Katty is a given name. Notable people with the name include:

 Katty Fuentes (born c. 1976), Mexican beauty pageant winner
 Katty Kay (born 1964), English journalist
 Katty Kowaleczko (born 1964), Chilean actress of Polish ancestry
 Katty Piejos (born 1981), French handball player

See also
Kattie, slingshot in South African English
Catty
Katy (disambiguation)